Haselhurst is a surname. Notable people with the surname include:

Alan Haselhurst, Baron Haselhurst (born 1937), British politician
Peter Haselhurst (born 1957), Australian field hockey player

See also
Hazelhurst (disambiguation)

English-language surnames